Per Incanto (foaled 2004) is a Thoroughbred racehorse who won the Group 3 Premio Tudini at age 3 and has gone on to forge a successful career as a stud stallion, siring a number of Group 1 winners.

He was bred by Scuderia Archi Romani.

Racing career

Per Incanto's wins were:

 September 2006 - Premio Brook (1200m), Rome
 November 2006 - Premio Olimpio (1200m), Rome
 March 2007 - Premio Trofeo Breez-Up (1400m), Rome
 April 2007 - Premio dei Laghu (1200m), Milan
 May 2007 - Premio Tudini (1200m Group 3), Rome, ridden by Gabriele Bietolini.
 March 2009 - Allowance Optional Claiming (1200m) at Aqueduct Racetrack, USA.

Stud career

Per Incanto stands at the Little Avondale Stud in the Wairarapa, New Zealand. He started his career with a low fee of NZ$4,000.  However, in the 2014/15 season he became the:
 leading first-season sire in New Zealand by winners.
 runner-up sire for 2-year-olds.

In the 2020-21 Hong Kong racing season Per Incanto finished top of the stallion premiership for:

 winners (17), ahead of Exceed And Excel and Snitzel, 
 wins (30), ahead of Snitzel and Deep Field.

Notable progeny

c = colt, f = filly/mare, g = gelding''

See also
  Thoroughbred racing in New Zealand

References

2004 racehorse births
New Zealand Thoroughbred sires
Champion Thoroughbred Sires of New Zealand